James Evans (born October 24, 1939) is a former American football wide receiver in the American Football League for the New York Jets. He played college football at Texas Western University (UTEP).

Early years
Evans attended Big Spring High School, before moving on to Howard College. He transferred to Texas Western University after his freshman season.

As a sophomore, he was a backup running back. The next year he was converted into a flanker, leading the team with 21 receptions for 242 yards, while playing in a run-oriented offense.

As a senior, he posted 36 receptions for 480 yards and 2 touchdowns, including 131 receiving yards against North Texas University, which at the time was the third best single-game mark in school history.

Professional career

Dallas Cowboys
Evans was selected by the Dallas Cowboys in the sixth round (83rd overall) of the 1964 NFL Draft and by the New York Jets in the fourth round (27th overall) of the 1964 AFL Draft. He chose to sign with the Cowboys but was waived on September 7.

New York Jets
In 1964, he was signed by the New York Jets to their taxi squad. After he recovered from a cut hand suffered in an automobile accident, he was promoted to the active roster on October 2 to replace flanker Alphonzo Lawson. He was a backup (12 games with one start) playing mainly on special teams, while leading the team in kickoff returns (13 for 259 yards).

In 1965, he played in nine games before suffering a separated shoulder and being placed on the taxi squad on October 29. He was promoted to the active roster later in the season. He was cut on August 8, 1966.

Buffalo Bills
In 1966, he was claimed off waivers by the Buffalo Bills, but was released one week later on August 16.

References

1939 births
Living people
People from Big Spring, Texas
Players of American football from Texas
American football wide receivers
Howard College alumni
UTEP Miners football players
New York Jets players